
Gmina Skała is an urban-rural gmina (administrative district) in Kraków County, Lesser Poland Voivodeship, in southern Poland.

The gmina contains part of the protected area called Dłubnia Landscape Park.

Villages
Apart from the town of Skała, Gmina Skała contains the villages and settlements of Barbarka, Cianowice Duże, Cianowice Małe, Gołyszyn, Maszyce, Minoga, Niebyła, Nowa Wieś, Ojców, Poręba Laskowska, Przybysławice, Rzeplin, Smardzowice, Sobiesęki, Stoki, Świńczów, Szczodrkowice and Zamłynie.

Neighbouring gminas
Gmina Skała is bordered by the gminas of Gołcza, Iwanowice, Jerzmanowice-Przeginia, Sułoszowa, Trzyciąż, Wielka Wieś and Zielonki.

References
Polish official population figures 2006

Skala
Kraków County